American singer Kelly Price started her singing career in 1992. She worked as a backing vocalist for singer Mariah Carey, before rising to greater prominence after making uncredited guest appearances on singles by rappers The Notorious B.I.G., and Mase. In 1998, Price released her debut album Soul of a Woman. It debuted and peaked at number 15 on the US Billboard 200 and spawned the R&B number-one hit single "Friend of Mine." In 1999, Soul of a Woman was certified platinum by the Recording Industry Association of America (RIAA), and by 2003, it had sold 1.13 million copies in the United States.

Mirror Mirror, Price's second album, was released in 2000. Her first top ten album, it debuted and peaked at number five on the Billboard 200 with first week sales of 157,000 copies. In 2001, the album was certified platinum by the RIAA. By July 2003, Mirror Mirror had sold 1.07 million copies in the United States. Following the release of her 2001 holiday album One Family: A Christmas Album, Price began work on her fourth studio album Priceless. Released in 2003, it debuted at number ten on the Billboard 200 with first week sales of 69,000 copies, but was commercially less successful than her previous albums.

After her departure from Def Soul, Price produced the gospel album This Is Who I Am. Released in 2006 via GospoCentric Records, it topped Billboards Top Gospel Albums for two weeks and became her fourth top ten album on the Top R&B/Hip-Hop Albums chart. In 2011, her fifth album Kelly was released. A return to the R&B sounds of her previous albums, it debuted and peaked at number 36 in the Billboard 200 and became a top ten success on both the US Independent Albums and the Top R&B/Hip-Hop Albums chart. In 2014, Price released her seventh album Sing Pray Love, Vol. 1: Sing through eOne. It became her seventh top ten album on the Top R&B/Hip-Hop Albums chart.

Albums

Studio albums

Compilation albums

Extended plays

Singles

As lead artist

As featured performer

Guest appearances

Soundtracks

Notes

References

Discographies of American artists
Rhythm and blues discographies
Soul music discographies